Bhoa Assembly constituency (Sl. No.: 2) is a Punjab Legislative Assembly constituency in Pathankot district, Punjab state, India. It covers Bhoa village. In 2017, it had  electors.

Members of the Legislative Assembly

Election results

2022

2017

2012

References

External links
  

Assembly constituencies of Punjab, India
Pathankot district